Pearson College London is a higher education institution, founded in 2012; it is based in London and owned by Pearson plc. The institution is officially separated into two subdivisions - Pearson Business School, which offers business-related degrees and short courses, and Escape Studios, a visual effects academy Pearson plc acquired in 2013 which offers degrees and short courses in the creative arts ranging from VFX to Game Art and Animation.

History

The creation of Pearson College London was announced in July 2011.

Pearson College London launched its first degree programme in September 2012.

In August 2013 it was announced that Pearson College London would begin offering business degrees validated by Ashridge Business School, whilst continuing with its partnership with Royal Holloway.

In October 2013 Pearson College London acquired Escape Studios, Europe's leading VFX academy. Escape Studios now also offers courses in VFX, Games and Animation at undergraduate, postgraduate and short course levels.

All degrees are currently awarded by a third party institute, most notably Business degrees are awarded by the University of Kent, but the college is in the process of getting their own degree awarding power from the relevant Government body.

In the past couple of years the size of the college has rapidly increased and currently it has approximately 1300 student (2019).

The college directly employs a minor amount of academic staff. Most lecturers are on a short-term contract working a couple of days a week. In the rest of their time, they usually work in the field of their expertise. This allows them to bring their experiences into the classrooms and work on real-life case studies. Due to the lack of full time academics, the college very rarely publishes academic papers.

Location
Students of Pearson College London primarily study at Pearson's offices in London at 190 High Holborn. The first three floors are solely occupied by the University, and have been transformed to cater for their needs. The size of the College is still relatively small, but with further increase in the number of students, more floors of the Person office building are likely to be re-purposed.

Admissions
Entry requirements vary depending upon the chosen course and level of study (undergraduate, postgraduate or short courses). Applicants are also required to attend a workshop day including an interview and an aptitude test. Courses usually cost £9250. Most students pay their fees by applying for a student finance.

The college does not have its own accommodation. Students normally are privately renting or staying in privately-owned students' halls, most noticeably Tunfell House and Felda House near Wembley Park.

Courses
Pearson College London offers undergraduate and postgraduate degrees and a range of short courses. The courses cover Business, Enterprise, Computer Animation, Video Games and Visual Effects. Courses can be studied full-time or part-time, depending on which course is chosen.

The degree programmes are awarded by the University of Kent. All of the degrees are designed, developed and delivered with industry partners including IBM, Sony Pictures Entertainment, WPP plc, Unilever, BT Group, Lloyd's of London, Savills and L'Oreal. Industry partners within VFX, Games and Animation include Framestore, The Mill, Moving Picture Company (MPC), BlueBolt, Electric Theatre, Milk and Jellyfish Pictures.

Pearson College previously offered a wide variety of degree apprenticeships, where students worked four days a week at one of the industry partners, then attended university one day a week. The schemes were usually free, and students got a wage from the company for whom they worked.

The college has September and January intakes, but this can vary. Full-time degree courses usually last three years, but students with exceptional academic standards are offered to take a two years' accelerated course.

References

External links
Official Pearson College website

Higher education colleges in England
Higher education colleges in London
2012 establishments in England
Educational institutions established in 2012
Pearson plc